Cofana is a genus of leafhoppers belonging to the family Cicadellidae. Cofana species can be often found in grass habitats and in rice fields. Some species have been recorded on Dinochloa scandens (Poaceae). The genus Cofana is distinguished by their male genital morphology, with an aedeagus lacking paraphyses and basal processes. The hindwing lacks vein R2+3. Species in the genus are found in Africa, Asia, and Australia.

Species 
Some species of this genus are:
Cofana albida  Walker, 1851
Cofana eburnea  Walker, 1857
Cofana fuscivenis  Bergroth, 1894
Cofana gelbata  Young, 1986
Cofana grisea  Evans, 1955
Cofana hoogstraali  Young, 1979
Cofana jedarfa  Young, 1979
Cofana karachiensis  Ara & Ahmed, 1988
Cofana karjatensis  Ramakrishnan, 1985
Cofana lata  Young, 1979
Cofana lineatus  Distant, 1908
Cofana maai  Young, 1979	
Cofana medleri  Young, 1979
Cofana nigrilinea  Stål, 1870
Cofana perkinsi  Kirkaldy, 1906
Cofana polaris  Young, 1979
Cofana separata  Young, 1979
Cofana sotoi  Young, 1979
Cofana spectra  Distant, 1908
Cofana subvirescens  Stål, 1870
Cofana trilobata Meshram & Ramamurthy, 2014
Cofana unimaculata  Signoret, 1854
Cofana yasumatsui  Young, 1979
Cofana yukawai  Kamitani, 2004

References 

Cicadellidae genera
Cicadellini